The Western Chain is a group of islets at  and a part of The Snares.

The islets all carry Māori names, from NE: Tahi (English: One), Rua (Two), Toru (Three), Whā (Four) and finally Rima (Five).

See also 

 New Zealand Subantarctic Islands
 List of Antarctic and subantarctic islands#List of subantarctic islands
 List of islands of New Zealand
 List of islands
 Desert island

References

Islands of the Snares Islands / Tini Heke
Important Bird Areas of the Snares Islands